Gragg is a surname. Notable people with the surname include:

Chris Gragg (born 1990), American football player
John Gragg, American football coach
Scott Gragg (born 1972), American football player
William B. Gragg, Emeritus Professor in the Department of Applied Mathematics at the Naval Postgraduate School.